Homole is a municipality and village in České Budějovice District in the South Bohemian Region of the Czech Republic. It has about 1,600 inhabitants.

Administrative parts
Villages of Černý Dub and Nové Homole are administrative parts of Homole.

References

Villages in České Budějovice District